The Smithsonian Institution Office of Protection Services is the guard force of the Smithsonian Institution.

It is a federal guard force consisting of 850 officers with special police authority tasked with protecting visitors, staff, property, and grounds of the federally owned and managed Smithsonian Institution museums and research centers in Washington, D.C., New York City, at the 2,800 acre Smithsonian Environmental Research Center in Maryland as well as oversight of the security operations at the Smithsonian Tropical Research Institute in Panama.

History 
According to a 1978 report by the Comptroller General of the United States:

In 1882 the Office of Public Buildings and Grounds was authorized to employ four watchmen to protect the buildings and grounds of the Smithsonian. The powers and duties of the watchmen were the same as those of the District's Metropolitan Police. Pursuant to 40 U.S.C. 193n, the Smithsonian was authorized to employ special policemen to police the buildings and grounds of the Institution. The special police were authorized to concurrently enforce, with the United States Park Police, the laws and regulations of the National Capital Parks.

Law enforcement authority
According to the U.S Code (Title 40, Chapter 63, §6306), Smithsonian guards and National Zoo police officers are designated as special police.  Subsection B outlines the powers of these special officers stating that they:

As a uniformed force in accordance with subsection C, employees designated as special police for the Smithsonian "may be provided, without charge, with uniforms and other equipment as may be necessary for the proper performance of their duties, including badges, revolvers, and ammunition."

The National Zoological Park Police being as a Federal Law Enforcement Agency that represents one of the five original full service police forces in the Washington District of Columbia share full police powers within the District of Columbia, in addition has a Congressional mandate in the form of a cooperative agreement with the Metropolitan Police Department of the District of Columbia to assist with law enforcement and crime prevention in a directed patrol areas in the Second, Third and Fourth Police Service areas around the National Zoological Park.

Positions

There are several position levels within the Office of Protection Services:
Smithsonian Museum protection officers are designated as "special police" under the US Code (Title 40, Chapter 63, §6306) and have limited police powers. They undergo training in CPR, firearm use, arrest, handcuff procedures, and pepper spray use. They are assigned to one of nineteen Smithsonian museums or research sites in New York City, Maryland, Virginia, or the District of Columbia. There is also a specialized K-9 unit with bomb-detection dogs that patrol museum grounds. Officers utilize patrol vehicles for most sites in D.C. as well as ATV and Boats for the facility in Maryland. Officers are armed with revolvers, which is now extremely unusual for most US law-enforcement agencies.
Smithsonian Museum physical security specialists and Supervisory physical security specialists assist in overseeing the protection operations at individual sites.

US National Zoological Park Police officers are specifically assigned to the National Zoo and the Smithsonian Conservation Biology Institute in Front Royal, Virginia. The National Zoological Park Police is one of the oldest police forces in the District of Columbia. According to the official National Zoo Website, the Zoological Police was one of the original five police agencies in D.C. created in 1889. The  National Zoo is a Smithsonian facility in the District of Columbia and is staffed 24 hours a day by full-time US National Zoological Park police officers. The National Zoo also maintains a 3200-acre Research facility (Smithsonian Conservation Biology Institute; SCBI) in Front Royal, Virginia; which is staffed by members of the National Zoological Park Police.  NZPP officers are Federal law enforcement officers and carry full law enforcement jurisdiction within the District of Columbia and Virginia that work closely with the Metropolitan Police Department and the US Park Police, as well as other federal law enforcement agencies to include Virginia Law Enforcement Authorities.

Law Enforcement Union membership
Smithsonian Museum officers in New York state and  District of Columbia belong to the American Federation of Government Employees (AFGE) Local 2463. Membership into the FOP in NYS is optional.

See also

 United States Park Police
 List of United States federal law enforcement agencies

References

External links
1978 Comptroller General Report
Office of Protection Services webpage
Smithsonian Institution webpage
AFGE local 2463
Fraternal Order of Police DC Lodge #1 Website
Fraternal Order of Police Lodge 38 website
Guard Force of the National Museum website

Special Police
Federal law enforcement agencies of the United States
Law enforcement agencies of the District of Columbia
Government agencies established in 1979
Agency-specific police departments of the United States